Genmar Holdings, Inc. was the second largest manufacturer of recreational motor boats, founded in 1978.  It was headquartered in Minneapolis, Minnesota with offices in Little Falls, Minnesota and Cadillac, Michigan.

In 2009, the company filed for Chapter 11 Bankruptcy.

Holdings
It owned the Aquasport, Carver Yachts, Champion Boats, Crestliner, Glastron, Hatteras Yachts, Larson Boats, Lowe Boats,  Scarab Boats, Trojan Yachts, and, Wellcraft brands.

Major transactions
 In 2001, Genmar sold Hatteras Yachts to Brunswick Corporation in an $80M cash transaction.
In 2010, PBH Marine Group  bought 11 brands, including Ranger Boats, Stratos Boats, Champion, Wellcraft, Four Winns, Larson and Glastron out of bankruptcy  for $70 million.
Platinum Equity bought the Ranger and Stratos lines of business in February 2010.
The Carver Yachts and Marquis Yachts assets were purchased for $6.05 million by J&D Acquisitions LLC, a company created by former Genmar owner Irwin Jacobs, along with investor John Paul DeJoria.

References

American boat builders
Defunct companies based in Minnesota
Holding companies of the United States
Holding companies established in 1978